Henry Allan 'Al' Gleason, Jr. (April 18, 1917 – January 13, 2007) was a linguist and Professor Emeritus at the University of Toronto.

Career
Gleason began studying at Hartford Seminary in 1938 and received his PhD in 1946. 
His 1961 text "Introduction to Descriptive Linguistics" (with an accompanying workbook) was described in the journal Language as a suitable update to Leonard Bloomfield's well-known textbook Language. Gleason retired in 1982.

Personal life
Gleason was a member of the American Bible Society, and a pastor in Fancy Gap, Virginia.
His father was botanist Henry Gleason, and mathematician Andrew Gleason was his brother.

References

External links
 Biography at Glottopedia

1917 births
2007 deaths
Hartford Seminary alumni
Academic staff of the University of Toronto
Linguists from the United States
20th-century linguists